Cydonius may refer to:

Demetrios Kydones (1324–1398), Byzantine theologian, translator, writer, and statesman
Prochorus Cydones ( 1330– 1369), Eastern Orthodox monk, theologian, and linguist
Andreas Eudaemon-Joannis (1566–1625), Greek Jesuit, natural philosopher, and controversialist